Data Kakus (a.k.a. Apau Data) is a remote Kenyah Badeng village settlement in the hilly interior of the Ulu Kakus Tatau division of Sarawak, Malaysia elevates to 650 metres, not far from Tubau and Belaga district. To be exact, Data Kakus is located at the upstream of Sungai Burok and Sungai Nyabet. The highest peak in Ulu Kakus is called Gunung Lumut about 828m located on the peak of Lumut Range not too far from Sungai Bekuyat and Sungai Kakus.

Travel to Data Kakus involves a five hours 4WD drive from Bintulu or Belaga, to get to Data Kakus one has to take the Bintulu-Bakun road and look for the junction to KTS camp from KTS camp to Simpang Jonat. It takes about 60 km using the logging road and from simpang Jonat it takes another 18 km to reach Data Kakus. It is also possible to trek Data Kakus from Belaga and it takes five to seven hours trekking from Long Sungai Pelaran (Sg. Sanan baan Kenyah), Sungai Ngajah from Rajang river then conquer Gunung Ngajah about 444m. The Kakus River or Batang Tatau begins as a stream near Data Kakus called Alo Nyabet or e-iut Nyabet or Sungai Burok, and it flows through Data Kakus, the end point where small boats such as 'moto setinding' can navigate. It is also possible to travel downriver from Data Kakus by longboat to Tatau town, it takes almost a day to get to Tatau town by boat as the river is too shallow, winding and small.

Neighbouring settlements include:

Rice production

This is the main activity for most of the Kenyah people in Data Kakus, where most of the communities grow the paddy hill at a few fertile land such as Sungai Padai, Lalut Deram, Ulu Sungai Burok, Long Ledong, Long Basuruo, Usun Uma', Iut Nyabet, Sungai Kakus, Abak Uma', Diam Songan and Nyulau. The traditional paddy planting is started in early August and a few months before that we are clearing the land by burning the whole paddy field area.
Planting paddy hill takes place each year in August and September (nugan), and harvesting starts in February the following year.

Infrastructure
The only road connecting Data Kakus to Bintulu is a rugged logging road by using a four-wheel-drive (4WD) vehicle. The journey from Bintulu to Data Kakus will be tougher if the road becomes slippery, muddy or flooded during the rainy season. The lack of proper access roads has caused a high living cost in Data Kakus because goods have to be transported from nearby towns by land. 

Power generation in Data Kakus is provided by Solar Panels and diesel generators. Data Kakus solar project was completed by Sarawak Energy in 2017 which led to a more reliable electricity supply. The telephone reception and Internet connection are not available in Data Kakus we hope that the government can provide a telecommunication tower and a solar-powered Very-Small-Aperture Terminal (VSAT) in Data Kakus to make this is possible in the future. Villagers need to travel about an hour to get to an area that is called Apau Saga to be able to receive the telecommunication signal and make or receive the telephone calls.

There is only one primary school in the Data Kakus that is SK Ulu Kakus primary school. Therefore, students must pursue their secondary education either in Belaga or Bintulu.

References

External links
 Website for Kenyah Badeng Sarawak

Villages in Sarawak